American house DJ and electronic dance music producer Kaskade has released ten studio albums, three compilation albums, 54 singles, and seven mix albums.

Albums

Studio albums

Compilation albums

DJ mix albums

Extended plays
 Redux EP 001 (2014)
 Redux EP 002 (2017)
 Redux EP 003 (2019)
 Redux EP 004 (2020)
 Reset (2021)
 Redux EP 005 (2021)

Singles

Mashups

Remixes

References

Discographies of American artists